Borrisokane GAA is a Gaelic Athletic Association club in County Tipperary in Ireland. Located in the town of Borrisokane, it is one of the oldest Gaelic games clubs in Ireland. It plays hurling and Gaelic football at all levels in the North division of Tipperary GAA.

History
In 2010, Borrisokane won the Tipperary Intermediate Hurling Championship which was their second title at that grade.

Honours
 North Tipperary Senior Hurling Championship (1)
 1933
 Tipperary Intermediate Hurling Championship (2)
1982, 2010
 Munster Intermediate Club Hurling Championship Runners- up
 2010
 North Tipperary Intermediate Hurling Championship (7)
 1940, 1952, 1958, 1973, 1982, 1995, 1996
 Tipperary Intermediate Football Championship (1)
 1994
 North Tipperary Intermediate Football Championship (9)
 1981, 1982, 1986, 1987, 1991, 1992,1994, 2014, 2016
 Tipperary Junior A Hurling Championship (2)
 1940, 1981
 North Tipperary Junior A Hurling Championship (3)
 1963, 1965, 1981
 Tipperary Junior A Football Championship (1)
 2012
 North Tipperary Junior A Football Championship (1)
 1938
 North Tipperary Junior C Hurling Championship (1)
 2009
 North Tipperary Under-21 A Hurling Championship (1)
 1960
 North Tipperary Under-21 B Hurling Championship (1)
 2013
 North Tipperary Under-21 A Football Championship (1)
 2013
 Tipperary Under-21 B Football Championship (1)
 2012
 North Tipperary Under-21 B Football Championship (2)
 2012, 2014
 North Tipperary Minor A Hurling Championship (1)
 1957 (with Shannon Rovers
 North Tipperary Minor B Hurling Championship
 2016
 Tipperary Minor C Hurling Championship (1)
 2001
 North Tipperary Minor B Football Championship (5)
 1998, 2003, 2004, 2010, 2016

References

External links
GAA Info Page
Tipperary GAA site

Gaelic games clubs in County Tipperary
Borrisokane